Mahākāla is a deity common to Hinduism and Tantric Buddhism. In Buddhism, Mahākāla is regarded as the sacred Dharmapāla ("Protector of the Dharma"), while in Hinduism, Mahākāla is a fierce manifestation of the Hindu god Shiva and the consort of the goddess Mahākālī; he most prominently appears in the Kalikula sect of Shaktism. Mahākāla also appears as a protector deity in Vajrayana, Chinese Esoteric, and Tibetan Buddhism (see Citipati), and also in the Chàn and Shingon traditions. He is known as Dàhēitiān and  Daaih'hāktīn (大黑天) in Mandarin and Cantonese, Daeheukcheon (대흑천) in Korean, Đại Hắc Thiên in Vietnamese, and Daikokuten (大黒天) in Japanese.

Etymology
 is a Sanskrit bahuvrihi of  "great" and  "time/death", which means "beyond time" or death.

 means "Great Black One".  "Protector" is also used to refer specifically to Mahākāla.

Description
 
According to Shaktisamgama Tantra, the spouse of Mahākālī is extremely frightening. Mahākāla has four arms, three eyes and is of the brilliance of 10 million black fires of dissolution, dwells in the midst of eight cremation grounds (śmaśāna). He is adorned with eight human skulls, seated on five corpses, holds a trident (triśūla), a drum, a sword, and a scythe in his hands. He is adorned with ashes from the cremation ground and surrounded by numbers of loudly shrieking vultures and jackals. At his side is his consort, symbolized as Kālī.

Both Mahākāla and Kālī represent the ultimate destructive power of Brahman and they are not bounded by any rules or regulations. They have the power to dissolve even time and space into themselves, and exist as the Void at the dissolution of the universe. They are responsible for the dissolution of the universe at the end of each kalpa. They are also responsible for annihilating great evils and great demons when other Gods, Devas, and even Trimurtis fail to do so. Mahākāla and Kālī annihilate men, women, children, animals, the world, and the entire universe without mercy because they are Kala or Time in the personified form, and Time is not bound by anything, and Time does not show mercy, nor does it wait for anything or anyone. In some parts of Odisha, Jharkhand, and Dooars (that is, in eastern Bengal), wild elephants are worshiped as manifestations of Mahākāla.

Mahākāla is typically depicted blue or black in colour. Just as all colours are absorbed and dissolved into black, all names and forms are said to melt into those of Mahākāla, symbolising his all-embracing, comprehensive nature. Black can also represent the total absence of colour, and again in this case it signifies the nature of Mahākāla as ultimate or absolute reality. This principle is known in Sanskrit as nirguna, beyond all quality and form, and it is typified by both interpretations.

In Hinduism

Mahakala is also known as Mahakala Bhairava in Hinduism, and many temples in India and Nepal are dedicated solely for Mahakala Bhairava, for example at the temple in Ujjain, which is mentioned more than once by Kālidāsa. The primary temple, place of worship for Mahakala is Ujjain. Mahakala is also a name of one of Shiva's principal attendants (Sanskrit: gaṇa), along with Nandi, Shiva's mount and so is often represented outside the main doorway of early Hindu temples.

In Buddhism

In Tibet

Mahayana Buddhism, and all schools of Tibetan Buddhism, rely on Mahakala as guardian deity. He is depicted in a number of variations, each with distinctly different qualities and aspects. He is also regarded as the emanation of different beings in different cases, namely Avalokiteśvara or Cakrasaṃvara. Mahakala is almost always depicted with a crown of five skulls, which represent the transmutation of the five kleśās (negative afflictions) into the five wisdoms.

The most notable variation in Mahakala's manifestations and depictions is in the number of arms, but other details can vary as well. For instance, in some cases there are Mahakalas in white, with multiple heads, without genitals, standing on varying numbers of various things, holding various implements, with alternative adornments, and so on.

Two-armed forms
The two-armed "Black-Cloaked Mahakala" is a protector of the Karma Kagyu school clad in the cloak of a māntrika "warlock". His imagery derives from terma of the Nyingma school and was adopted by the Karma Kagyu during the time of Karma Pakshi, 2nd Karmapa Lama. He is often depicted with his consort, Rangjung Gyalmo. He is often thought to be the primary protector, but he is in fact the main protector of the Karmapas specifically. Four-Armed Mahakala is technically the primary protector. Six-Armed Mahakala is also a common dharmapala in the Kagyu school.

Pañjaranātha Mahakala "Mahakala, Lord of the Tent", an emanation of Mañjuśrī, is a protector of the Sakya school.

Four-armed forms
Various Four-Armed Mahakalas (Skt. Chaturbhūjamahākāla) are the primary protectors of the Karma Kagyu, Drikung Kagyu, Drukpa Lineage and the Nyingma of Tibetan Buddhism. A four-armed Mahakala is also found in the Nyingma school, although the primary protector of the Dzogchen (Skt: Mahasandhi) teachings is Ekajati.

Six-armed forms
Nyingshuk came from Khyungpo Nenjor, the founder of the Shangpa Kagyu, and spread to all the lineages (Sakya, Nyingma, and Gelug) and to the Kagyu lineages. There are also terma lineages of various forms of Six-Armed Mahakala. Nyinghsuk, though derived from the Shangpa, is not the major Shangpa one; it is in a dancing posture rather than upright, and is a very advanced Mahakala practice. The White Six-Armed Mahakala (Skt: Ṣadbhūjasītamahākāla) is popular among Mongolian Gelugpas.

Other forms

In China
Mahākāla is mentioned in many Chinese Buddhist texts, although iconographic depictions of him in China were rare during the Tang and Song periods. He eventually became the center of a flourishing cult after the 9th century in the kingdoms of Nanzhao and Dali in what is now the province of Yunnan, a region bordering Tibet, where his cult was also widespread. Due to Tibetan influence, his importance further increased during the Mongol-led Yuan dynasty, with his likeness being displayed in the imperial palace and in Buddhist temples inside and outside the capital.

In some texts, Mahākāla is described as a fearsome god, a "demon who steals the vital essence (of people)" and who feeds on flesh and blood, though he is also said to only devour those who committed sins against the Three Jewels of Buddhism. One story found in the Tang-era monk Yi Xing's commentary on the Mahāvairocana Tantra portrays Mahākāla as a manifestation of the buddha Vairocana who subjugated the ḍākinīs, a race of flesh-eating female demons, by swallowing them. Mahākāla released them on the condition that they no longer kill humans, decreeing that they could only eat the heart - believed to contain the vital essence of humans known as 'human yellow' - of those who were near death. A tale found in Amoghavajra's translation of the Humane King Sūtra relates how a heterodox (i.e. non-Buddhist) master instructed Prince Kalmāṣapāda (斑足王) to offer the heads of a thousand kings to Mahākāla, the "great black god of the graveyard", if he wished to ascend the throne of his kingdom.

As time went by, Mahākāla also became seen as a guardian of Buddhist monasteries, especially its kitchens. The monk Yijing, who traveled to Srivijaya and India during the late 7th century, claimed that images of Mahākāla were to be found in the kitchens and porches of Indian Buddhist monasteries, before which offerings of food were made:

In China, the god was also associated with fertility and sexuality: during the Qixi Festival (a.k.a. the Double Seventh Festival) held on the 7th day of the 7th month of the Chinese calendar, married women traditionally bought dolls or figurines called 'Móhéluó' or 'Móhóuluó' - the term probably deriving from 'Mahākāla' - in the hopes of giving birth to a child. Ritual texts also prescribe the worship of Mahākāla to women looking for a male partner or to pregnant women. In addition, he is also commonly invoked as a protective deity in certain mantras, such as the Śūraṅgama Mantra and the Mahamayuri-vidyarajñi-dharani contained in the Mahamayuri Vidyarajñi Sutra, which are popular in Chan Buddhism tradition.

In Japan

Mahakala (known as Daikokuten 大黑天) enjoys an exalted position as a household deity in Japan, as he is one of the Seven Lucky Gods in Japanese folklore.

The Japanese also use the symbol of Mahakala as a monogram. The traditional pilgrims climbing the holy Mount Ontake wear tenugui on white Japanese scarves with the Sanskrit seed syllable of Mahakala.

In Japan, this deity is variously considered to be the god of wealth or of the household, particularly the kitchen. He is recognised by his wide face, smile, and a flat black hat, in stark contrast to the fierce imagery portrayed in Tibetan Buddhist art. He is often portrayed holding a golden mallet, otherwise known as a magic money mallet, and is seen seated on bales of rice, with mice nearby (mice signify plentiful food).

See also
 Vajrakilaya

References

Citations

Works cited

Further reading

External links

Mahakala Main Page at Himalayan Art Resources
Mahakala Puja Part One: Introduction, Empowerment and Reading Transmission
Mahakala at Khandro.net

Agricultural gods
Buddhist tantras
Dharmapalas
Chinese deities
Chinese gods
Fortune gods
Japanese gods
Tibetan Buddhist practices
Tantra
Forms of Shiva
Time and fate gods
Creator gods
Destroyer gods
Herukas
Wrathful deities